Jelena Pirsl (born October 28, 1985 ) is a Croatian handballer playing for Ardeşen GSK and the Croatian national team. The -tall sportswoman plays in the goalkeeper position.

Between 2010 and 2012, she played for Maliye Milli Piyango SK before she joined Ardeşen GSK in 2014.

References

1985 births
Handball players from Rijeka
Croatian female handball players
Croatian expatriate sportspeople in Turkey
Expatriate handball players in Turkey
Ardeşen GSK players
Living people